General Mamerto Natividad, officially the Municipality of General Mamerto Natividad (Ilocano: Ili ti Heneral Mamerto Natividad), also known as Gen. M. Natividad, is a 4th class municipality in the province of Nueva Ecija, Philippines. According to the 2020 census, it has a population of 44,311 people.

History
In 1957, the barrios of Mataas na Kahoy, Balangkare Norte, Balangkare Sur, Sapang Kawayan, Magasawang Sampaloc, Talabutab Norte, Talabutab Sur, Platero, Belen, Pecaleon, Piñahan, Kabulihan, Pasong-Hari, Balaring, Pulong Singkamas, Panaksak, Bravo, Sapang Bato, Burol, Miller, Tila Patio, Pula, Carinay, and Acacia, in the City of Cabanatuan separated from the said city and constituted into a separate and independent municipality known as General Mamerto Natividad.

Geography

Barangays
General Mamerto Natividad is politically subdivided into 20 barangays.

 Balangkare Norte
 Balangkare Sur
 Balaring
 Belen
 Bravo
 Burol
 Kabulihan
 Mag-asawang Sampaloc
 Manarog
 Mataas na Kahoy
 Panacsac
 Picaleon
 Piñahan
 Platero
 Poblacion
 Pula
 Pulong Singkamas
 Sapang Bato
 Talabutab Norte
 Talabutab Sur

Climate

Demographics

Economy

References

External links

 
 [ Philippine Standard Geographic Code]
Philippine Census Information
Local Governance Performance Management System 

Municipalities of Nueva Ecija
Populated places on the Pampanga River